{{Automatic taxobox
| taxon = Carniella
| authority = Thaler & Steinberger, 1988
| type_species = C. brignolii
| type_species_authority = Thaler & Steinberger, 1988
| subdivision_ranks = Species
| subdivision = 13, see text
| synonyms = 
Marianana Georgescu, 1989<ref name=Nae2012>{{cite journal| last=Nae| first=A.| year=2012| title=Carniella mihaili (Georgescu, 1994) – new combination of genus and description of the male (Araneae, Theridiidae)| journal=Travaux de l'Institut de Spéologie "Émile Racovitza"| volume=51| page=2}}</ref>
| synonyms_ref = 
}}Carniella is a genus of comb-footed spiders that was first described by K. Thaler & K.-H. Steinberger in 1988.

Species
 it contains thirteen species, found in Asia, Europe, and Angola:Carniella brignolii Thaler & Steinberger, 1988 (type) – Belgium, Switzerland, Germany, Austria, RomaniaCarniella coreana Kim & Yoo, 2018 (type) – South KoreaCarniella detriticola (Miller, 1970) – AngolaCarniella foliosa Gao & Li, 2014 – ChinaCarniella forficata Gao & Li, 2014 – ChinaCarniella globifera (Simon, 1899) – Indonesia (Sumatra)Carniella krakatauensis Wunderlich, 1995 – Indonesia (Krakatau)Carniella nepalensis  Tanasevitch & Marusik, 2020 – NepalCarniella orites Knoflach, 1996 – ThailandCarniella schwendingeri Knoflach, 1996 – ThailandCarniella siam Knoflach, 1996 – ThailandCarniella strumifera Gao & Li, 2014 – ChinaCarniella sumatraensis Wunderlich, 1995 – Indonesia (Sumatra)Carniella tsurui Ono, 2007 – TaiwanCarniella weyersi'' (Brignoli, 1979) – China, Indonesia (Sumatra)

See also
 List of Theridiidae species

References

Araneomorphae genera
Spiders of Asia
Theridiidae